Kazuaki (written: , , , , , ,  or ) is a masculine Japanese given name. Notable people with the name include:

, Japanese freestyle skier
, Japanese football goalkeeper (J2 League)
, Japanese speed skater
, Japanese footballer
, Japanese scientist
, Japanese photographer, film director and music video director
, Japanese football midfielder (J.League)
Kazuaki Kurihara (born 1979), Japanese Shotokan karate instructor
, Japanese football midfielder (J.League)
, Japanese rower
, Japanese baseball pitcher
, Japanese politician
, Japanese football midfielder and manager
, Japanese cyclist
, Japanese calligrapher, Zen teacher, writer and translator
, Japanese football midfielder (J.League)
, Japanese samurai

Japanese masculine given names